The Women's heptathlon event at the 2011 European Athletics U23 Championships was held in Ostrava, Czech Republic, at Městský stadion on 16 and 17 July.

Medalists

Results

Final
17 July 2011 / 18:40

Participation
According to an unofficial count, 18 athletes from 13 countries participated in the event.

References

Heptathlon
Combined events at the European Athletics U23 Championships
2011 in women's athletics